Equality Ohio is a nonpartisan, nonprofit organization that advocates for full equality for the LGBTQ community. It is the statewide authority advocating for LGBT families with over 30,000 members. It is headquartered in Columbus, Ohio. It was founded in 2005 following the passage of Ohio Issue 1, which banned state recognition of same-sex relationships. Equality Ohio's first Executive Director, Lynne Bowman is one of the founders of Equality Ohio and served as its executive director for over 5 years. Sue Doerfer, became Executive Director in December 2009 and announced her resignation in November 2010. She was replaced by Ed Mullen, a former candidate for Illinois State Representative and civil rights lawyer from Chicago., Equality Ohio accepted the resignation of Ed Mullen, effective 29 June 2012. Kim Welter then served as the Interim Executive Director, has served as the Director of Programs and Outreach at Equality Ohio and has five years of experience. She joined the organization in 2008 after serving as the Executive Director of Equality Toledo for over 2 years. In November 2012 the organization hired its fourth Executive Director, Elyzabeth Joy Holford.

In addition to other efforts, Equality Ohio worked toward passing state legislation to prohibit employment or housing discrimination based on sexual orientation.

In early 2011, Equality Ohio embarked on a strategic planning process to guide its work from 2011 to 2014.  Equality Ohio solicited input on its strategic plan from its founders and early leaders, LGBT community leaders and members, and allies around the state.  On 17 May 2011, the Boards of Equality Ohio and Equality Ohio Education Fund each adopted the strategic plan.

The two current legislative priorities are the passage of the Equal Housing and Employment Act (HB335 / SB231) and enumeration of the safe schools legislation which was passed January 2012 (HB208). Equality Ohio will continue to work with LGBT rights organizations throughout Ohio and nationally to achieve those goals.

The organization is a member of the Equality Federation.

See also

 LGBT rights in Ohio
 Same-sex marriage in Ohio
 List of LGBT rights organizations

References

External links
 Official website of Equality Ohio

LGBT political advocacy groups in Ohio
2005 establishments in Ohio
Organizations established in 2005
Organizations based in Columbus, Ohio
Charities based in Ohio
Equality Federation
LGBT rights in Ohio